The Petit Jean River Bridge may refer to:

  Petit Jean River Bridge (Yell County, Arkansas)
  Petit Jean River Bridge (Logan County, Arkansas)